To celebrate the tenth anniversary of the Grand Final, the RFL challenged fans to name their ultimate starting line-up made up of players who have played in previous Grand Finals. Thousands of people took part with the aim of trying to match as many names as possible to those selected by a panel of experts that included Sky Sports’ commentator Stevo, the Independent’s Dave Hadfield, League Weekly’s Danny Lockwood and League Express’ Martyn Sadler.

This team was chosen before the Leeds Rhinos' victory over St. Helens in the 2007 Grand Final, and is based on player's performances in previous grand finals.

The Ultimate 13 Grand Final team reflects the success which St. Helens and Bradford Bulls have had in reaching the Grand Final since its inception in 1998. The Bulls are represented by six former players which include Jamie Peacock who played in the 2007 final with Leeds Rhinos.

All Time Grand Final XIII

References
Bradford Bulls Official Website

Ultimate 13: Grand Final Team